Mitti Aur Sona (transl. Clay and Gold) is a 1989 Indian Bollywood action film directed by Shiv Kumar and produced by Pahlaj Nihalani. The film stars Chunky Pandey, Sonam, Neelam in lead roles.

Plot 
Vijay (Chunky Pandey) is from a wealthy family and is a college student. Anupama (Neelam) is his best friend and the parents of both expect them to get married. But when Vijay meets Neelima (Sonam) he falls in love with her. But his parents are against the match as Neelima is an orphan who is poor and also of questionable character. Vijay leaves home to work as a truck driver.

Cast 
 Chunky Pandey as Vijay Bhushan
 Sonam as Anupama / Neelima
 Neelam as Asha / Anupama
 Vinod Mehra as Inspector Sunil
 Pran as Advocate Yashwant Sinha
 Prem Chopra as Chinoy
 Gulshan Grover as J.C.
 Om Shivpuri as Brij Bhushan

Soundtrack

External links 
 

1980s Hindi-language films
1989 films